Mount Gaudry is a mountain,  high, rising close southwest of Mount Barre and  north-northwest of Mount Liotard in the southern part of Adelaide Island, Antarctica. It was discovered by the French Antarctic Expedition, 1903–05, under Jean-Baptiste Charcot, who named it after Albert Gaudry, a prominent French paleontologist.

See also
List of Ultras of Antarctica
List of islands by highest point

References

External links
"Mount Gaudry, Antarctica" on Peakbagger

Mountains of Adelaide Island